Sie kommen aus Agarthi is a German television series.

See also
List of German television series

External links
 

1975 German television series debuts
1975 German television series endings
German-language television shows
Das Erste original programming